Daniel Franzese (born May 9, 1978) is an American actor, comedian, and activist best known for his roles in director Larry Clark's Bully and as Damian in Tina Fey's 2004 feature film Mean Girls. Franzese is the creator of several live comedy shows, including the 2011 rock opera Jersey Shoresical: A Frickin' Rock Opera! and his one-man stand-up performance I've Never Really Made the Kind of Money to Become a Mess in 2013.

After coming out as gay in 2014, Franzese became more active in the fight for civil and human rights in the LGBTQ community; and through his portrayal of the HIV-positive character Eddie in the second season of the HBO series Looking, and its subsequent series finale television film, Looking: The Movie, he has become a well known AIDS activist in the United States. In 2015, he became an ambassador for the Elizabeth Taylor AIDS Foundation.

In 2020, Franzese began hosting a weekly comedy and faith podcast, Yass, Jesus! with former Trinity Broadcasting Network host Azariah Southworth.

Early life
Franzese was born in Bensonhurst, Brooklyn, New York, the son of Denise, a cafeteria worker, and Ralph "R. J." Franzese, a lounge singer. Franzese attended Piper High School in Sunrise, Florida from 1992 to 1996. After high school, he attended Florida School of the Arts in Palatka, Florida. He is of Italian descent.

Career

Actor
Daniel Franzese has appeared in numerous feature films, including Bully, Party Monster, Mean Girls, Bristol Boys and War of the Worlds. He has also guest starred on several television series, including The Comeback, CSI: Crime Scene Investigation, Burn Notice, Party Down, and the web series Foodies. He had a main role in the 2010 film I Spit on Your Grave.

In 2015, he was cast as Eddie in the HBO series Looking; and in 2016 he landed the role of Vern Testaverde in ABC Family's Recovery Road. In 2016 and early 2017, he portrayed Jackson Morrison in ABC's legal drama Conviction.

Comedian
Franzese has written, directed and performed several live comedy productions, including his one-man Off-Broadway show, I’ve Never Really Made the Kind of Money to Become a Mess, which premiered in New York in 2013 at The Players Theater, and his 2011 rock opera JERSEY SHORESICAL: A FRICKIN ROCK OPERA!, which also premiered in New York at The Fringe Festival before its run in Los Angeles at the Hayworth Theatre. Franzese is also an emerging stand-up comedian, and has performed on stages across America at clubs like Stand Up Live in Phoenix and the Comedy Store in Hollywood.

Franzese has been a guest panelist on the Logo TV comedy game show Gay for Play Starring RuPaul and was the host of Gay Skit Happens, a comedy sketch show, also on Logo TV.

Franzese's stand up comedy tour, Yass You're Amazing!, found success at colleges, clubs and theaters. He has also headlined The Burbank Comedy Festival, The Ruby LA Queer Comedy Festival. In 2019, Franzese performed his hit New York comedy show Danny Franzese and The House Of Glen Coco at SF Sketchfest featuring his pick of the best and brightest in queer comedy.

Curator
On October 12, 2007, Franzese curated his first art show called Halloween, a multi-artist show which examined celebrity, vanity, money, and the titular holiday.

On April 25, 2008, at the World of Wonder Storefront Gallery in Los Angeles, California, Franzese curated an art show called depARTed. The show featured art  inspired by famous personalities from Marilyn Monroe, Judy Garland, James Dean and Anna Nicole Smith to notable figures such as Abraham Lincoln and Martin Luther King Jr., to artists such as Keith Haring and Isabella Blow. Artists included Ron English, Keyth Ryden (also known as KRK Ryden), and Jessicka.

Franzese's show, Crusaders and Haters, at Royal/T gallery showcased an assortment of work from artists from all over the world, depicting superheroes and villains in pop culture. The show opened July 17, 2009.

Outreach
Controversy was sparked after Franzese posted a video about how he was in talks with Walsh University to host an event, but was later told that the university was no longer  interested. Franzese alleged that he had been fired from the event for being homosexual and the university being Catholic. This caused LGBTQIA+ students on the university campus to speak about their (largely negative) experiences. Franzese outreached to the students to show support.

Activist 
After penning a coming out letter to his Mean Girls character Damian in 2014, in which the actor spoke of his admiration for the courage Damian displayed as an openly gay teenager and referring to him as an icon for gay youth, Franzese became an influential voice in the LGBTQ community. When he became an official ambassador for the Elizabeth Taylor AIDS Foundation, organizations such as GLAAD invited Franzese to host their 2015 gala in San Francisco. He also presented the GLAAD playbook on HIV and AIDS to MSNBC on behalf of the organization. His reputation as an activist grew after he was awarded the role of Eddie, an HIV-positive activist for a non-profit organization, in the HBO series Looking. During his time on the series, Franzese used his celebrity to promote messages of acceptance and understanding for people living with HIV at special events, through media appearances, and a speeches at college campuses, including the University of Wisconsin in April 2016.

Franzese is also an ambassador for LAMBDA Legal, which is dedicated to decreasing the stigma associated with people living with HIV, and changing current HIV-related laws.

In September 2019, Franzese was an ambassador and the host for the AIDS Walk Atlanta & 5K Run, a fundraising and awareness campaign that raises funds to help prevent the spread of HIV/AIDS and to provide critical social services and healthcare for people living with HIV. He was also the captain of his team for the event: Team Glen Coco.

In addition to his advocacy on behalf of HIV patients, on March 22, 2019, Franzese partnered with Lonely Whale and Bacardi in their efforts to stop pollution of the oceans with discarded plastic. They generated #thefuturedoesntsuck campaign to persuade the Unicode Consortium to remove all single-use plastic straws, which endanger marine wildlife, from drink icons in its emoji catalog.

Personal life
In 2016, Franzese proposed to his boyfriend of two years, stylist Joseph Bradley Phillips, at a Starbucks in North Hollywood, California. They called off their engagement in July 2018.

Filmography

References

External links
 

1978 births
Living people
American male film actors
American male television actors
American male stage actors
Male actors from Florida
Male actors from New York City
People from Bensonhurst, Brooklyn
American people of Italian descent
21st-century American male actors
American gay actors
Gay comedians
LGBT people from New York (state)
LGBT people from Florida
Piper High School (Florida) alumni
21st-century LGBT people
American LGBT comedians